The Leichhardt colonial by-election, 1864 was a by-election held on 14 April 1864 in the electoral district of Leichhardt for the Queensland Legislative Assembly.

History
On 8 February 1864, Charles Royds, the member for Leichhardt, resigned. His brother Edmund Royds won the resulting by-election on 14 April 1864.

See also
 Members of the Queensland Legislative Assembly, 1863–1867

References

1864 elections in Australia
Queensland state by-elections
1860s in Queensland